Priyamvada Gopal (born 1968) is an Indian-born academic, writer and public intellectual who is Professor of Postcolonial Studies at the University of Cambridge. Her primary teaching and research interests are in colonial and postcolonial studies, South Asian literature, critical race studies, and the politics and cultures of empire and globalisation. She has written three books engaging these subjects: Literary Radicalism in India (2005), The Indian English Novel (2009) and Insurgent Empire (2019). Her third book, Insurgent Empire, was shortlisted for the 2020 Nayef Al-Rodhan Prize for Global Cultural Understanding.

Gopal's work has appeared in several newspapers and online publications, and she has contributed occasionally to radio and television programmes in Britain and elsewhere. Her remarks about race and empire have gained media attention and condemnation. In 2021, she was named one of the world's top 50 thinkers by Prospect magazine.

Biography

Early life
Gopal was born in Delhi, India. The daughter of an Indian diplomat, she spent her childhood in India, Sri Lanka and Bhutan, and attended an international high school in Vienna, where her father served as a diplomat in the mid-1980s. She is from a Brahmin family; she is a critic of the caste system.

Education and career
Gopal received a BA in English from the University of Delhi in 1989 and an MA in Linguistics from Jawaharlal Nehru University in 1991. After finishing her studies in India, she moved to the United States to pursue graduate studies in English. She received an MA in English from Purdue University in 1993. She continued her postgraduate work at Cornell University, earning an MA in English in 1996 and a PhD in colonial and postcolonial literature in 2000.

She began her teaching career as a graduate instructor in the Department of English at Cornell University in 1995. She joined Connecticut College in 1999 as an Assistant Professor of English leaving in 2000. She moved to the University of Cambridge in 2001, where she is professor of Postcolonial Studies in the Faculty of English and a teaching fellow at Churchill College. She supervises and teaches in the areas of literary criticism, modern tragedy, 19th-century and modern British literature, and postcolonial and related literatures. Her primary interests are in colonial and postcolonial literatures, with related interests in British and American literatures, the novel, translation, gender and feminism, Marxism and critical theory, and the politics and cultures of empire and globalisation. From 2006 to 2010, she was Dean of Churchill College.

Thought

Empire
Gopal has written extensively about the impact of empire on contemporary culture in Britain and examined its broader social and cultural effects in South Asia and other former colonial societies. According to Gopal, her motivation to speak about issues of empire and colonialism started with an appearance on a 2006 edition of BBC Radio 4's Start the Week, in which she challenged Niall Ferguson's assertions about the British Empire. She said that it was this experience that galvanized her to write and think more publicly about empire.

In her book Insurgent Empire, Gopal examines traditions of dissent on the question of empire and shows how rebellions and resistance in the colonies influenced British critics of empire in a process she calls "reverse tutelage". She argues that ideas of freedom, justice, and common humanity had themselves taken shape in the struggle against imperialism.

Gopal has also written about the historical amnesia surrounding empire and called for a more honest account of how Britain came to be what it is today. She argues that developing a demanding relationship to history is essential to understanding the formative and shaping nature of the imperial project on British life.

Churchill, empire and race
In October 2020, Churchill College set up a working group to critically examine Winston Churchill's views and actions relating to empire and race. The working group held two events: "Churchill, Empire and Race: Opening the Conversation" and "The Racial Consequences of Mr Churchill". Gopal was a member of the Working Group and a speaker in both panel discussions.

In June 2021, college Master Athene Donald ended the Working Group's role after a dispute between the College Council and the working party. In her statement, Donald stated that Gopal was frustrated over the Council's rejection of the Working Group's proposals for the third event. She said that Gopal consequently wrote that the group might as well dissolve themselves. Donald said that rightly or wrongly, she took that statement at face value and abruptly ended the role of the group. Gopal rejected the rationale given for the group's dissolution and said that the college had instead disbanded the group. She said that the disbanding was a way for the college to preempt the resignation of several members of the working group over the college pandering to the tabloid press and other groups. In her Twitter feed, Gopal called attention to the role of the Daily Mail, Policy Exchange and the Churchill family in pressuring the college to discontinue the event, accusing university leaders of "taking fright" after the backlash. Gopal tweeted: "Let me repeat: under pressure from groups like Policy Exchange and some members of the Churchill family, Churchill College has dissolved a group created to critically engage with Churchill's complicated legacies. Let that sink in."

In July 2021, the Working Group released a statement denying that they had disbanded themselves and accused the college of not following due process in ending its role. The group also accused the College Council of undermining academic freedom and bringing the college into disrepute.

Decolonisation
Gopal believes decolonisation is about a process of thinking about our intellectual, personal and political formation in a historical frame. In an essay "On Decolonisation and the University", she wrote that decolonisation "commits to recognising the centrality of colonialism in shaping the globe as we experience it today; to assessing its consequences for communities and cultures; to interrogating and dismantling harmful mythologies and falsehoods on which the colonial project relied as well as those that underpin its afterlife today; and to repairing the great gaps in our knowledge and understanding that have emerged consequently (sic)."

In relation to cultural and intellectual work, she argues that decolonisation poses different kinds of questions in different contexts about our relationship to colonialism. She argues that decolonisation in the European context involves Europe 'reckoning with its colonial self-constitution and thinking about the legacies and afterlives of colonialism both "within" and "without" its complicated and shifting borders.' She draws on Ngũgĩ and Fanon to argue that Europe's material, cultural and intellectual riches also cannot be separated from its encounters with the Global South.

Gopal contends that decolonisation must begin with an unflinchingly truthful engagement with empire and colonialism, and a sustained study of how Europe's forays into the world made Europe.

Gopal has been a long-standing advocate for 'decolonisation' of Cambridge’s English curriculum. In June 2017, a group of Cambridge students asked the university to include more black and ethnic minority writers in its English literature curriculum, an initiative strongly supported by Gopal. She argues that decolonisation in the curriculum context is ‘about’ having access to information and narratives, which reframe our understanding of the multiple lineages and sources of knowledge.

Race
Gopal has written and commented extensively on the subject of race and how it operates in contemporary society. She argues that whiteness is primarily a cultural category, not a biological one, and is useful for explaining how western societies work in terms of how society is structured, and how such structures determine power relations between dominant and non-dominant groups.

In the context of racial discrimination in the United Kingdom, Gopal has discussed white fragility, suggesting that a "way of deflecting engagement with race is to personalise matters". In October 2019, Gopal criticised the Equality and Human Rights Commission report "Tackling racial harassment: Universities challenged" for its language and not addressing the systemic disadvantages faced by black and minority ethnic students or the ways whiteness dominates power structures and pedagogy.

King's College racial profiling dispute
In June 2018, Gopal alleged racial profiling by college porters at the gate of King's College, Cambridge. Gopal said that she was subjected to racial profiling and aggression by the porters and gatekeepers of King's and that porters frequently hassled non-white staff and students at the gates. Gopal told a journalist from The Sunday Times it "was behaviour I very much doubt a white man of middle age who identified himself as a lecturer" would have faced. Gopal announced that she would no longer teach at King's until there was a resolution to the long-standing problem.

As a result of the attention the issue received, Cambridge University students came forward describing similar experiences. Students of English at King's also issued an open letter in support of Gopal, urging the college to offer her a "proper apology": "The many testimonies from black and minority ethnic students that have come in the wake of Dr Gopal's statement make apparent that her treatment is not unique or isolated. We strongly condemn the actions of the college and fully support Dr Gopal in her decision to boycott it." Gopal said that she received hate mail following her announcement.

In October 2018, King's issued a statement accepting that there had been several reports of discrimination and racial profiling. Gopal said senior college members also conveyed their private apologies and assured her that the college was taking the problem seriously. Shortly afterwards, Gopal rescinded her decision to withdraw her labour from the college.

"White lives don't matter. As white lives" tweet 
On 23 June 2020, Gopal tweeted "White lives don't matter. As white lives" and "Abolish whiteness", in response to a banner flown over a Premier League football stadium that read "White lives matter Burnley". She received abusive messages, including death threats, following her tweet. Gopal told the media that her comments were opposing the concept of whiteness – the presumption of white superiority – and challenging the racial basis for lives mattering, adding that it wasn't whiteness that gave lives their dignity, nor should it be the criteria for lives mattering. Gopal stood by her tweets asserting that her comments were "very clearly speaking to a structure and ideology, not about people".

The following day, the University of Cambridge tweeted a blanket defence of its academics' right to free speech, without explicitly referencing her case. A statement released by the university read: "The University defends the right of its academics to express their own lawful opinions which others might find controversial and deplores in the strongest terms abuse and personal attacks. These attacks are totally unacceptable and must cease".

In November 2020, the Daily Mail paid £25,000 in damages to Gopal after the paper falsely alleged that she was attempting to incite a race war and that she supports and endorses the subjugation and persecution of white people. The allegations, made by Amanda Platell in a column following the "White lives" tweet, were based on an inflammatory quote from a fake Twitter account, which Platell's column falsely attributed to Gopal. The column had also partially quoted Gopal's "White lives" tweet as saying 'White lives don't matter.', but chose to omit the remainder of the quote, which went on to state "As White Lives", distorting its context and meaning. In addition to paying damages, the newspaper also published full apologies in the Daily Mail and agreed to pay Gopal's legal costs.

Criticism of Tony Sewell, chair of the Commission on Race and Ethnic Disparities 
In March 2021, the Commission on Race and Ethnic Disparities, chaired by educational consultant Tony Sewell, released its report on race and ethnic disparities in the UK. Gopal argued the report cherry-picked data and minimised and denied structural and institutional racism, asserting that it read like a propaganda document rather than a piece of research. She also questioned whether Sewell had a doctorate. When she learned he did, Gopal tweeted: "Okay, established. It is, in fact, Dr Sewell. Fair enough. Even Dr Goebbels had a research PhD. (University of Heidelberg, 1921)". The comparison to Goebbels, a prominent Nazi, attracted criticism from commentators writing for The Times and The Daily Telegraph. Gopal claimed that her remark was a reference to Goebbels, not a comparison.

Anti-Semitism dispute 
In January 2022, historian David Abulafia wrote an article in The Daily Telegraph criticising the acquittal of the protesters who toppled the statue of slave trader Edward Colston in Bristol in 2020. In the article, Abulafia described historian David Olusoga, a witness for the defence of the protesters, as 'eloquent'. Gopal criticised the article on social media. She also tweeted that Abulafia's description of Olusoga as 'eloquent' could sound dismissive, particularly when pertaining to writers of colour. According to Gopal, the word appeared "to be damning with faint praise, to suggest that (Olusoga) is all style and drama, no substance."

Abulafia told Varsity that he thought it was "insulting or possibly libellous" to infer that his remark had a racist overtone. Varsity reported his criticisms of it verbatim, suggesting Gopal had used the word "racism" to describe Abulafia's comments. Gopal claimed that the news editor of Varsity concocted the story about her supposed charge of 'racism' against Abulafia, claiming she had become a target because she had criticised the IHRA definition of anti-Semitism. She said that the news editor was among those who lobbied to adopt the definition in full. She also said that the student journalist behind the story had "quite powerful familial connections to the liberal media", and that the criticism of her in the student newspaper Varsity was not "quite the little campus story ... that it is supposed to be".

The Cambridge University Jewish Society and Abulafia, noting that Abulafia and the student were Jewish, condemned Gopal's remarks as evoking anti-Semitic conspiracy theories. Gopal released a statement saying that Varsity had "published misleading and false claims" about her words that had subjected her to "a concerted racist and misogynist attack across the British right-wing press." The Cambridge Branch of the University and College Union also issued a statement supporting Gopal and condemning journalists in "the right-wing press" and Varsity for misrepresenting her views.

Bibliography

Books
 Literary Radicalism in India: Gender, Nation and the Transition to Independence (Routledge, 2005) 
 The Indian English Novel: Nation, History and Narration (Oxford University Press, 2009)
 Insurgent Empire: Anticolonial Resistance and British Dissent (Verso, 2019)

Articles
  vol. 4, no. 1, pp. 73–102 (1997)
  vol. 32, no. 3, pp. 61–88 (2001)
  pp. 150–166 (2002)
  pp. 139–161 (2004)
  issue 59, pp. 81–98 (2006)
  vol. 112, no. 1, pp. 115–128 (2013)
  vol. 39, no. 1, pp. 98–118 (2013)
  vol. 57, no. 3, pp. 18–30 (2016)
  pp. 21–36 (2016)
  vol. 35, no. 6, pp. 873–899 (2021)

References

External links
 University of Cambridge Staff Profile
 Churchill College, Cambridge Staff Profile

1968 births
Living people
Delhi University alumni
Jawaharlal Nehru University alumni
Cornell University alumni
Academics of the University of Cambridge
Fellows of Churchill College, Cambridge
People from Delhi
Indian emigrants to the United Kingdom
Postcolonial theorists